Miss U.S. Virgin Islands is a beauty pageant in the US Virgin Islands.

History
Between 1961 and 1978, the National Committee of Virgin Islands celebrated Miss Virgin Islands contest, in which the grand winners competed at the Miss Universe and other beauty pageants. Beginning in 1979, the official name changed to Miss U.S. Virgin Islands.

Franchise ownership and extended history
The Miss U.S. Virgin Islands competition began in 1956 when Miriam Edna Golden was crowned as the first Miss Virgin Islands in June 1956 (sponsored by Virgin Islands Hotel Association.) In 1961 was the second edition of Miss Virgin Islands, which saw the first international delegate Priscilla Bonilla representing the territory at Miss Universe 1961 in the United States. The pageant was then owned by Sam King (Owner of Pan American Finishing School) and the U.S. Virgin Islands Carnival Committee. In franchise history, Cherrie Raphaelia Creque has been the only Miss Universe U.S. Virgin Islands to place in the Top 12 at Miss Universe. The only other international pageant finalist from the U.S Virgin Islands has been Esonica Veira of St. Thomas, who was awarded 4th Runner up in The Miss Supranational in Minsk, Belarus in September 2013. 

Through the 1990s, franchise ownership of the Miss U.S Virgin Islands title belonged to The Lions Club of St. Thomas and also to Debra Gottlieb; a local staple in pageantry.

Titleholders

Representatives at Big Four international pageants

Miss Universe U.S. Virgin Islands 

The winner of Miss U.S. Virgin Islands represents the U.S territory at the Miss Universe. Between 1961 and 1978 Miss Virgin Islands winners went to Miss Universe with a Virgin Islands sash before a constitutional referendum was declared. On March 6, 1979 the queen was officially referred to as Miss U.S Virgin Islands. The Miss US Virgin Islands represents the islands to Miss Universe. The celebration of Miss U.S. Virgin Islands was not held in 2000, 2003-2004, 2008-2009, 2012-2013, and in 2015. It made a return in 2016.

Miss World U.S. Virgin Islands 

Between 1976 and 1980, it was unknown how the delegates representing the U.S. territory were chosen. Between 1982 and 2005 the Miss American Virgin Islands went to Miss World. In 2010, the Miss World USVI committees appointed the delegate to Miss World 2010 in Sanya. From 2012-2016 the Miss US Paradise winner is the selected delegate to the Miss World pageant. In 2019, a separate pageant called Miss World USVI was held to select the delegate for the Miss World pageant.

Miss Earth U.S. Virgin Islands

Miss International U.S. Virgin Islands

References

External links
missuniverseusvi.com

US Virgin Islands
US Virgin Islands
US Virgin Islands
Recurring events established in 1961
Beauty pageants in the United States Virgin Islands
United States Virgin Islands awards
1956 establishments in the United States Virgin Islands